Pidotimod is an immunostimulant.

References

Carboxylic acids
Immunostimulants
Thiazolidines
Carboxamides
Pyrrolidines
Lactams